OPRA can refer to:

 Options Price Reporting Authority an American financial markets data authority
 Occupational Pensions Regulatory Authority, a former UK government body
 Open Public Records Act